Prestwich is a tram stop in the town of Prestwich, Greater Manchester, England. It is on the Bury Line of Greater Manchester's light rail Metrolink system.

History 
The stop was originally Prestwich railway station, which was along the Manchester to Bury heavy rail line, completed by the Lancashire & Yorkshire Railway, in 1879 and opened on 1 September.  The line was converted from steam to electric power as from 17 April 1916, using the third rail system. The station closed on 17 August 1991 to allow conversion of the route to the Metrolink system using overhead power lines, reopening on 6 April 1992.

The station forms part of Ticketing Zone 3. It is located off Rectory Lane a walkway connects the station to the Longfield Suite Precinct and Bury New Road (A56).

Services
Services mostly run every 12 minutes on 2 routes, forming a 6-minute service between Bury and Manchester at peak times.

Connecting bus routes
Arriva North West service 484 ran to Eccles until Late 2020 when it was replaced by Diamond North West service 66 to the nearby Tesco and Prestwich Hospital stops outside the station.

On Bury New Road, which is on the opposite side of the shopping centre, Go North West services 92, 93 (Evenings Only) and 98 run between Bury and Manchester (92 via Unsworth, Hollins and Pilsworth, 93 via Unsworth and 98 via Whitefield and Radcliffe), along with Go North West's 95 service between Bury and Salford. Blackburn Bus Company service X41 (Branded as Red Express) between Manchester and Blackburn via Accrington and Burnley Bus Company service X43 (Branded as Witchway) between Manchester and Nelson via Rawtenstall and Burnley also stop on Bury New Road.

References

External links

Prestwich Stop Information
Prestwich area map
A Youtube video of Class 504s at Prestwich, before conversion into Metrolink.
"The Directory of Railway Stations", R.V.J.Butt, 1995, Patrick Stephens, Sparkford UK, 

Tram stops in the Metropolitan Borough of Bury
Former Lancashire and Yorkshire Railway stations
Railway stations in Great Britain opened in 1879
Railway stations in Great Britain closed in 1991
Railway stations in Great Britain opened in 1992
Tram stops on the Altrincham to Bury line
Tram stops on the Bury to Ashton-under-Lyne line
Prestwich